Ray Richardson (born 1964) is a British painter. He lives and works in London.

Biography 
He spent his childhood in the Woolwich Dockyard area. Graduated from Saint Martin's School of Art (1983–1984) and Goldsmiths College (1984–1987), he won his first British Council Award in 1989 and the BP Portrait Award in 1990. At the same time, he began a long collaboration with three galleries: Boycott Gallery in Brussels, Galerie Alain Blondel in Paris and Beaux Arts gallery in London. Since 2016, he collaborates with the Zedes Art Gallery in Brussels.

Based on his observations, he paints his world of southeast London. In 1993, the Telegraph Magazine commissioned him paintings and drawings of the world heavyweight champion boxer Lennox Lewis which were then offered by the magazine to and accepted by the National Portrait Gallery.

Over time, he has depicted not only everyday scenes in southeast London but a larger social panorama, mixing criticism, humour and personal concerns. Richardson uses his very emblematic English Bull Terrier as a metaphor or double in his narration which takes places in urban or coastal landscapes, caravans and football fields.

Both filled with pictorial tradition (Titian, Goya, Hogarth, Hopper) and contemporary cultures (soul music, photography), his works are characterised by a formal closeness with cinema. Interested in Film noir movies amongst other genres of film, he tries "to combine the traditional stuff of painting with the cinematic ways of looking at things". Because of his subjects and the transposition of filmmaker techniques (close-up, horizontal formats, use of shadow to create drama), he has been dubbed by Lindsay MacCrae (GQ magazine) as the "Martin Scorsese of figurative painting", and Iain Gale (The Independent) stated: "There is a filmic quality in these works which proposes Ray Richardson as a David Lynch of canvas and paint."

In 2014–2015, two of his works are part of Reality: Modern and contemporary British painting, an exhibition about the most influential painters from the last sixty years at the Sainsbury Centre for Visual Arts and the Walker Art Gallery, alongside Francis Bacon, Ken Currie, Lucian Freud, David Hockney, Paula Rego, George Shaw, Walter Sickert, Stanley Spencer, etc.

In 2017, the young Belgian director, Nina Degraeve, dedicated a short documentary entitled "Our side of the water" to Richardson.

Selected solo exhibitions 
 1989: The Cat In The Hat, Boycott Gallery, Brussels
 1992: The Odd Man Out, Galerie Alain Blondel, Paris
 1994: Oostenders, Beaux Arts Gallery, London
 1996: One Man On A Trip, Beaux Arts Gallery, London. The Luckiest Man In Two Shoes, Galerie Alain Blondel, Paris
 1999: MFSB, Beaux Arts Gallery, London
 2001: Out Of Town, Boycott Gallery, Brussels
 2004: Storyville, Advanced Graphics, London
 2005: An English Phenomenon, Mendenhall Sobieski Gallery, Los Angeles. Lazy Sunday, Gallagher and Turner, Newcastle upon Tyne
 2009: Music For Pleasure, Galerie Alain Blondel, Paris. With A Little Pinch Of London, Advanced Graphics, London
 2012: Everything is everything, Beaux-Arts, London.
 2014: The Jack Lord, Ben Oakley Gallery, London
 2016: London Soul, Beaux-Arts, London
 2016 : You caught me smilin' again, Zedes Art Gallery, Brussels

Selected group shows 
 1988: The John Player Portrait Award, National Portrait Gallery, London
 1990: BP Portrait Award, National Portrait Gallery, London
 1993: RA Summer Show, Royal Academy, London
 1998: The Morecambe And Wise Show (with Mark Hampson), Glasgow Print Studio
 1999: OKUK (with Mark Hampson), Gallery Aoyama & Laforet Museum, Tokyo
 2002: England Away (Mark Hampson), Gallery Aoyama & Laforet Museum, Tokyo
 2012: BP Portrait Award, National Portrait Gallery, London; Never Promised Poundland (with Cathie Pilkington and Mark Hampson), No Format Gallery, London
 2014: REALITY: Modern and Contemporary British Painting, Sainsbury’s Centre for Visual Arts, Norwich
 2015: REALITY: Modern and Contemporary British Painting, Walker Art Gallery, Liverpool; Linolcut (with Picasso, Peter Blake, Sol LeWitt, Wayne Thiebaud and Gary Hume), Paul Stolper Gallery, London
 2016: Still life – Style of life, Jean-Marie Oger, Paris

Awards 
 1989: British Council Award
 1990: BP Portrait Award Commendation
 1999: British Council Award
 2002: British Council Award
 2007: Association of Painter Printmakers A.R.E.
 2012: Artist in Residence Eton College. Founders Painting Prize ING Discerning Eye

Bibliography and media 
 Ray Richardson – One Man On A Trip, texts by Edward Lucie-Smith and Iain Gale, Beaux Arts Gallery, London, 1996.
 Oil on canvas, 30-minutes documentary, BBC2, 1999 & 1997.
 Fresh, LWT, 1998.
 Sampled, Channel 4, 1998.
 Ray Richardson – Storyville, interview with Hanif Kureishi, Advanced Graphics London, 2004.
 Reflections, film by Ray Richardson and Glen Maxwell with Deptford Albany, 2004.
 From the Artist’s Studio, BBC Radio 3, 2005.
 Ray Richardson – Everything is Everything, text by Jake Auerbach, Beaux Arts Gallery, London, 2012.
 Ray Richardson : Our side of the water, Nina Degraeve, Belgium, 2017.''

References

External links 
 Ray Richardson
 Beaux Arts London
 Jean-Marie Oger
 Ben Oakley gallery
 Zedes Art Gallery

1964 births
Living people
People from Woolwich
Alumni of Saint Martin's School of Art
Alumni of Goldsmiths, University of London
20th-century English painters
English male painters
21st-century English painters
British contemporary painters
20th-century English male artists
21st-century English male artists